Northern Flowers was a Russian language literary almanac published yearly in Saint Petersburg from 1825 to 1832. The full title in Russian was Северные цветы, собранные бароном Дельвигом (Northern flowers, collected by baron Delvig. The main editors were Anton Delvig and Alexander Pushkin.

References

Annual magazines
Defunct literary magazines published in Europe
Defunct magazines published in Russia
Magazines established in 1825
Magazines disestablished in 1832
Magazines published in Saint Petersburg
Literary magazines published in Russia
Russian-language magazines